This is a list of known gang members. The term gang member refers to a criminal who is a member of a crime organization. The terms are widely used in reference to people associated or affiliated with street gangs, prison gangs, and biker gangs.

Denho Acar
Salvador Agron
Jesús Ledesma Aguilar
Curtis Allgier
Orlando Anderson
Sonny Barger
David Barksdale
Nicky Barnes
Brandon Bernard
Tyler Bingham
Vivian Blake
Maurice Boucher
Harry Joseph Bowman
Carl Wayne Buntion
Yves Buteau
John Butler
Rodolfo Cadena
Genaro Ruiz Camacho
Ruben Cavazos
Donald Eugene Chambers
Michael Chen
Chen Chi-li
Samuel Christian
Peter Chong
Raymond "Shrimp Boy" Chow
Christopher Coke
David Barron Corona
Tiequon Cox
Ion Croitoru
Nicky Cruz
Rolando Cruz
Duane "Keefe D" Davis
Rayful Edmond
Johnny Eng
Sonny Enraca
Rene Enriquez
Pedro Espinoza
Luis Felipe
Guy Fisher
Joe Fong
Jeff Fort
Kenneth Foster
Clayton Fountain
Alex García
Juan Martin Garcia
Anthony Garrett
Juan Garza
Jay Goldstein
Bobby Gore
Gabriel Granillo
Mark Guardado
Willie Haggart
Shauntay Henderson
Larry Hoover
George Jackson
Jan Krogh Jensen
Bumpy Johnson
Dany Kane
John Fitzgerald Kennedy
King Tone
Tung Kuei-sen
Jose Landa-Rodriguez
Bill Lee
Michael Ljunggren
Antônio Francisco Bonfim Lopes
Frank Lucas
Luis Macedo
Santiago Villalba Mederos
Ramadan Abdel Rehim Mansour
Raymond Márquez
Alpo Martinez
Howard Mason
Greg Mathis
Frank Matthews
Robert Edward Maxfield
Timothy Joseph McGhee
Kenneth McGriff
José Medellín
Jeremy Meeks
Lea Mek
Benjamin Melendez
Richard Merla
Barry Mills
Felix Mitchell
Thomas Möller
Erismar Rodrigues Moreira
Joe "Pegleg" Morgan
Dontae Morris
Jørn Nielsen
O. G. Mack
Michael O'Farrell
Javier Ovando
José Padilla
Anthony Porter
Emigdio Preciado Jr.
Alfredo Prieto
Edwin Ramos
Eduardo Ravelo
Wallace Rice
Luis J. Rodriguez
"Freeway" Rick Ross
Shorty Rossi
Joe Saenz
Robert Sandifer
Kaboni Savage
Sanyika Shakur
Thomas Silverstein
Aimé Simard
Colton Simpson
Slobbery Jim
Wolodumir "Walter" Stadnick
Binyamin Stimler
Mark Anthony Stroman
Darren Taylor
Regis Deon Thomas
Jemeker Thompson
Jim Tinndahn
Yves Trudeau
Alex Vella
Troy Victorino
Raymond Washington
Damien Watts
David Wax
Damian Williams
Kenneth Williams
Stanley Williams
Marion Wilson
Ronell Wilson
Yang Fuqing

See also 

 List of gangs in the United States

References